Clarence Anderson may refer to:

 Clarence W. Anderson (1871–1944), Canadian politician
 Clarence William Anderson (1891–1971), author and illustrator of children's books
 Bud Anderson (Clarence Emil Anderson, born 1922), United States Air Force officer